The 1964 World Men's Handball Championship was the fifth team handball World Championship. It was held in Czechoslovakia. Romania won the championship.

Final standings

Results

Preliminary Round 

GROUP A

GROUP B

GROUP C

GROUP D

Main Round 
Results from Preliminary round carried over to Main round.

GROUP 1

GROUP 2

Final Round

External links 
 IHF – Official resultats
 todor66.com

World Handball Championship tournaments
World Men's Handball Championship
H
World
World Men's Handball Championship